Jean-Louis Lagadec (23 May 1933 – 3 October 2012) was a French professional football player and coach.

Career
Born in Le Havre, Lagadec played club football for Le Havre, Racing Paris, Bastia and Chalon; he was also manager of the latter club.

Later life and death
Lagadec died on 3 October 2012.

References

1933 births
2012 deaths
French footballers
French football managers
Le Havre AC players
Racing Club de France Football players
SC Bastia players
FC Chalon players
FC Lorient managers
Footballers from Le Havre

Association footballers not categorized by position